Brouay is a former commune in the Calvados department in the Normandy region in northwestern France. On 1 January 2017, it was merged into the new commune Thue et Mue. There is a cemetery for war dead in the churchyard, with 377 graves of combatants killed during the Normandy campaigns - mostly from the United Kingdom.

Population

See also
Brouay War Cemetery
Communes of the Calvados department

References

Former communes of Calvados (department)
Calvados communes articles needing translation from French Wikipedia
Populated places disestablished in 2017